Vavilovia formosa is a species of flowering plants in the legume family, Fabaceae. It belongs to the subfamily Faboideae. It is the only member of the genus Vavilovia. It was named after the Russian geneticist, economic botanist, and plant geographer, Nikolai Ivanovich Vavilov. It is found primarily in high mountain areas on shale or rocky ground in Turkey, Iran, Iraq, and Lebanon.

References

Fabeae
Monotypic Fabaceae genera